Brian Norford (born September 15, 1932) is a British-Canadian geologist and paleontologist who served as the chancellor of the University of Calgary in Alberta from 1982 until 1986.

He was awarded the Ambrose Medal of the Geological Association of Canada in 1994.

References

1932 births
Living people
Canadian university and college chancellors